Buzz Teeniez Awards is an annual award ceremony in Kampala, Uganda that was started in 2007 by a magazine called Buzz. The Buzz Teeniez Awards are catered to teen viewers to honor the biggest achievers in television, music, gospel, Dee Jays, movies, Sports, Radio and more.

Award categories 
The Teeniez Buzz Awards categories include: television, music, gospel, Dee Jays, movies, Sports, Radio and more.

Music
 Teeniez male artist
 Teeniez female artist
Teeniez best comedian
 Teeniez Hottest group/duo
 Teeniez Best Album
 Teeniez hottest Riddim
 Teeniez Hood Rapper
 Teeniez R&B Artist/Group
 Teeniez Dancehall/Group
 Teeniez Fresh/Breakout Artist

Gospel
 Teeniez Artist
 Teeniez Song

Dee Jays
 Teeniez Wickedest D.J.
 Teeniez Beat Maker

Radio Industry
 Teeniez Hottest Radio Personality
 Teeniez Funkiest Radio Station

TV Industry
 Teeniez TV Personality
 Teeniez TV Drama/Soap/Local Show
 Teeniez TV Station

Achievement Award
 Teeniez Role Model
 Teeniez Outstanding School
 Teenie of the Year

Special Award
 Extra Ordinary Achievement Award

Business World
 Teeniez Best New Business/Campaign/Product
 Business with the Dopest Customer Service

Past winners 
 2007 Winners
 2008 Winners
 2009 Winners
 2010 Winners
 2011 Winners 
 2012 Winners
 2013 Winners

Controversy 
The Buzz Teeniez Awards have been criticized for describing a category as "riddim" and then failing to follow the meaning of "riddim" when picking past winners, and for including NTV and Hot 100, the award sponsors, as nominees.

References

Awards established in 2007
2007 establishments in Uganda